Elias Barnabas Inyasi who is predominantly known by his stage names, Barnaba Classic and Barnaba boy is a singer, songwriter and performer from Tanzania.

Career 
Barnaba began his musical career from training for vocals in his local church choir in 2000. He was scouted and later joined the Tanzanian House of Talent (THT) at the age of 17. His breakthrough song was "“Baby I Love You"" song released in 2007. In 2022 he released a 19 songs album featuring 20 musicians from East Africa.

Music In Africa's and Tanzanian Music Journalist, Charles Maganga praised Love Sounds different Album by naming the 18-track body of work as "Barnaba Classic's most celebrated body of work to date"

Awards and nominations 
Tanzania Music Awards

|-
|2011
|Nabembelezwa
|Best Zouk/Rhumba song
|
|-
|2012
|Himself
|Best male artist
|
|}

Discography

References

Living people
21st-century Tanzanian male singers
Year of birth missing (living people)